Emil V. "Al" Cianciulli (1930–2019) was an American lawyer, businessman, civil rights advocate, and Korean War veteran who also served as the chairman of Hofstra University's Board of Trustees.

Life & career

Education 
Cianciulli graduated from Hofstra University in 1952. He then earned his PhD from Fordham University.

Career

Military service 
Cianciulli served in the Korean War with the United States Army, and earned a Bronze Star for his service.

Law 
Cianculli would help establish the law firm of Suozzi, English & Cianciulli, which is now named Meyer, Suozzi, English & Klein; he had also served as its president and chief executive.

Eventually, Cianciulli would also help establish the firm of Cianciulli & Meng.

Island Helicopter 
In 1984, Cianciulli became the president and chief executive of Island Helicopter after previously serving as its vice chairman.

Hofstra University 
Cianciulli served on Hofstra University's Board of Trustees between 1972 and 1986, and also served on Hofstra's legal counsel. He originally served as a secretary, eventually becoming its vice-chairman and ultimately its chairman.

Additionally, Cianciulli won several awards from Hofstra – including its Presidential Medal. He also created the school's Emil V. Cianciulli Endowed Scholarship.

Involvement with hospitals 
Cianciulli served as an associate trustee for both North Shore University Hospital and St. Francis Hospital.

Civil rights advocacy 
Cianciulli was a vocal advocate for civil rights and social justice, and was awarded by the Long Island Chapter of the National Conference of Christians and Jews.

Death 
Cianciulli died in October 2019. He is buried at Calverton National Cemetery in Calverton, New York.

He was survived by his wife, Clare Knowles, his daughter, Valery Smith, three grandchildren, and a great grandchild, Emily. He was predeceased by his son, Christopher.

Flags at Hofstra were flown at half-mast following Cianciulli's death.

Personal life 
Cianciulli lived in Flower Hill, New York.

References 

Flower Hill, New York
Hofstra University alumni
Hofstra University people
Fordham University alumni
1930 births
2019 deaths
Burials at Calverton National Cemetery
American military personnel of the Korean War